Wanda Treumann (born Wanda Reich; 17 November 1883 – 29 April 1963) was a German theatre and film actress and film producer of the silent era. A leading lady in a number of productions during the Imperial era and the Weimar Republic, she retired from the screen in 1922. Her later life remains obscure.

Selected filmography
 The Oath of Stephan Huller (1912)
 The Coquette (1917)
 Not of the Woman Born (1918)
 In the Castle by the Lake (1918)
 The Secret of the Scaffold (1919)
 A Night in Paradise (1919)
 The Secret of Wera Baranska (1919)
 Colonel Chabert (1920)

References

Bibliography
Thomas Elsaesser & Michael Wedel. A Second Life: German Cinema's First Decades. Amsterdam University Press, 1996.

External links

1883 births
1963 deaths
German stage actresses
German film actresses
German silent film actresses
20th-century German actresses
German film producers
Jewish emigrants from Nazi Germany to Australia
People from Myszków County